Marco Gerhardt van Staden (born 25 August 1995) is a South African rugby union player formerly of Leicester Tigers in Premiership Rugby, England's top domestic tier of rugby. His regular position is flanker.

Van Staden started his 2018 rugby season playing in Varsity Cup, he earned himself his first Blue Bulls cap, and becoming a regular starter throughout the 2018 season campaign. Later that year Van Staden made his international debut for the Springboks (18 August 2018) as a replacement against . He is the first player in South African rugby history to play university, franchise and country in a single year.

Honours
 Super Rugby Unlocked 2020
 Currie Cup winner 2020–21
 Gallagher Premiership Winner 2021-22

References

South African rugby union players
Living people
1995 births
People from Krugersdorp
Rugby union flankers
Blue Bulls players
Bulls (rugby union) players
South Africa international rugby union players
Rugby union players from Gauteng
Leicester Tigers players